Stanislav I. Braginsky was a Research Geophysicist at UCLA. In 1964 he contributed to models of the geodynamo with his theory of the "nearly symmetric dynamo", published 1964. He emigrated from the Soviet Union to the United States in 1988.

In 1992 the American Geophysical Union awarded him the John Adam Fleming Medal for contributions to geomagnetism.

Selected publications

References

Living people
University of California, Los Angeles faculty
Soviet geophysicists
Year of birth missing (living people)
Soviet emigrants to the United States